Győri ETO KC is a Hungarian women's and defunct men's handball club, based in Győr, Hungary. This is their record in European handball.

Women's team

European record
As of 7 January 2023:

EHF-organised seasonal competitions
Győri ETO women's team score listed first. As of 16 February 2023.

Record against other teams
Record against other teams in EHF organised competitions. Last updated on 16 February 2023.

Women's Champions League

Women's EHF Cup

Women's City Cup (Challenge Cup)

Women's Cup Winners' Cup
From the 2016–17 season, the women's competition was merged with the EHF Cup.

Men's team

EHF-organised seasonal competitions
Győri ETO men's team score listed first. As of 13 September 2018

European Cup

EHF Cup

City Cup (Challenge Cup)

Cup Winners' Cup
From the 2012–13 season, the men's competition was merged with the EHF Cup.

References

External links
 Official website
 Győri Audi ETO KC (women's team) at eurohandball.com
 Győri ETO FKC (men's team) at eurohandball.com

Hungarian handball clubs in European handball